This is a list of football stadiums in the United Arab Emirates. The list includes venues used for professional football and other stadiums with a capacity over 5,000 to have been used for football.

References

United Arab Emirates
Stadiums
Football stadiums